Eduard Meijer (25 February 1878 in Amsterdam – 20 March 1929 in Amsterdam) was a Dutch freestyle swimmer and water polo player who competed in the 1900 Summer Olympics and 1908 Summer Olympics.

In 1900 he competed in the 4000 metre freestyle competition and finished fifth.
Eight years later he participated in the 1500 metre freestyle competition, but he was eliminated in the first round. He was also part of the Dutch water polo team, which finished fourth in the 1908 tournament.

He is the older brother of Karel Meijer.

References

External links
 

1878 births
1929 deaths
Dutch male freestyle swimmers
Dutch male long-distance swimmers
Dutch male water polo players
Olympic swimmers of the Netherlands
Olympic water polo players of the Netherlands
Swimmers at the 1900 Summer Olympics
Swimmers at the 1908 Summer Olympics
Water polo players at the 1908 Summer Olympics
Swimmers from Amsterdam